Earl “Paul” Douglas (born c. 1950) is a Jamaican Grammy Award-winning drummer and percussionist, best known for his work as the drummer, percussionist and bandleader of Toots and the Maytals.  His career spans more than five decades as one of reggae's most recorded drummers. Music journalist and reggae historian David Katz wrote, “dependable drummer Paul Douglas played on countless reggae hits."

Douglas has worked with artists including Bob Marley and the Wailers, Bonnie Raitt, and Eric Gale. Douglas has also toured with artists including The Rolling Stones, Willie Nelson, Dave Matthews Band, The Who, Eagles and Sheryl Crow.

Early life 
Paul Douglas was born in St. Ann, Jamaica. His career as a professional musician began in 1965 at the age of 15.

Influences 
Douglas’ musical influences include Lloyd Knibb, Steve Gadd, Harvey Mason, Sonny Emory, Elvin Jones, William Kennedy, Carlos Santana, Bob Marley, John Coltrane, Sam Cooke, George Duke, Boris Gardiner, The Skatalites, Eric Gale, Leslie Butler, George Benson, Marvin Gaye, David Garibaldi, and David Sanborn.

Affiliated groups 

While Douglas has maintained an active career as a studio musician for reggae, jazz, and funk artists since 1965, he has also been a member of several notable musical groups.

Toots and the Maytals 

In 1969 Douglas joined Toots and the Maytals as a founding member of the band as it is known today, which up to that time had consisted of a vocal trio. Douglas has been the group's drummer, percussionist and bandleader from 1985 to the present day.

Excerpt from "The Rise of Reggae and the influence of Toots and the Maytals" by Matthew Sherman:"...Reggae was born. Toots (Toots Hibbert) heralded the new sound with the seminal, complex groove monster "Do the Reggay"...Toots could do no wrong recording for Leslie Kong. With the consistent nucleus of musicians, the Beverley's All-Stars (Jackie Jackson, Winston Wright, Hux Brown, Rad Bryan, Paul Douglas and Winston Grennan) and the Maytals’ brilliant harmonizing..."Reggae is listed in the dictionary as:reggae [reg-ey] (noun) - a style of Jamaican popular music blending blues, calypso, and rock-'n'-roll, characterized by a strong syncopated rhythm and lyrics of social protest. Origin of reggae: Jamaican English, respelling of reggay (introduced in the song “Do the Reggay” (1968) by Frederick “Toots” Hibbert).Accompanied by Paul Douglas and Radcliffe "Dougie" Bryan in studio, Jackie Jackson explained the formation of the group in a radio interview for Kool 97 FM Jamaica:“We’re all original members of Toots and the Maytals band.  First it was Toots and the Maytals, three guys: Toots, Raleigh, and Jerry.  …And then they were signed to Island Records, Chris Blackwell.  And we were their recording band.  One day we were summoned to Chris’ house.  And he says, “Alright gentleman, I think it’s time.  Toots and the Maytals looks like it’s going to be a big thing”.  By this time he had already signed Bob (Marley).  So in his camp, Island Records, there was Toots and the Maytals / Bob Marley; we were talking about reggae is going international now.  We kept on meeting and he (Blackwell) decided that the backing band that back all of the songs, the recording band, should be the Maytals band.  So everything came under Toots and the Maytals.  So we became Maytals also.  And then we hit the road in 1975...we were the opening act for the Eagles, Linda Ronstadt, and Jackson Browne.  We were the opening act for The Who for about two weeks.”

Paul Douglas, Jackie Jackson and Radcliffe ‘Dougie’ Bryan are recognized as founding members who, along with frontman Toots Hibbert, continue to perform in the group to the present day.

The first Toots and the Maytals album released and distributed by Chris Blackwell's Island Records was Funky Kingston.  Music critic Lester Bangs described the album in Stereo Review as “perfection, the most exciting and diversified set of reggae tunes by a single artist yet released.” As Chris Blackwell says, “The Maytals were unlike anything else...sensational, raw and dynamic.” Blackwell had a strong commitment to Toots and the Maytals, saying “I’ve known Toots longer than anybody – much longer than Bob (Marley). Toots is one of the purest human beings I’ve met in my life, pure almost to a fault.”

On 1 October 1975, Toots and the Maytals were broadcast live on KMET-FM as they performed at The Roxy Theatre in Los Angeles.  This broadcast was re-mastered and released as an album entitled “Sailin’ On” via Klondike Records.

President Donald Trump was quoted as appreciating the reggae music of Toots and the Maytals when he said, “I heard the guest band, Toots & The Maytals, practising out on the set [of Saturday Night Live; Trump co-hosted an episode in April 2004]. They sounded terrific, and I went out to listen to them for a while. My daughter Ivanka had told me how great they were, and she was right. The music relaxed me, and surprisingly, I was not nervous."

In 2015, Vogue magazine listed the song “54-46 Was My Number” by Toots and the Maytals as one of their “15 Roots Reggae Songs You Should Know”; and in an interview with Patricia Chin of VP Records, Vogue listed the group as part of an abbreviated list of early “reggae royalty” that recorded at Studio 17 in Kingston, which included Bob Marley, Peter Tosh, Gregory Isaacs, Dennis Brown, Burning Spear, Toots and the Maytals, The Heptones, and Bunny Wailer.

In 2017, Toots and the Maytals became the second reggae-based group to ever perform at the Coachella festival, after Chronixx in 2016.

Bob Marley and the Wailers 

Douglas contributed to several of Bob Marley's albums, including Small Axe and Soul Shakedown Party which were released on the Beverley's label, and performed live with Bob Marley and the Wailers in the early 70s. The Wailers worked with reggae producer Leslie Kong, who used his studio musicians called Beverley's All-Stars (Jackie Jackson, Paul Douglas, Gladstone Anderson, Winston Wright, Rad Bryan, Hux Brown) to record the songs that would be released as an album entitled “The Best of The Wailers”. The tracks included “Soul Shakedown Party,” “Stop That Train,” “Caution,” “Go Tell It on the Mountain,” “Soon Come,” “Can’t You See,” “Soul Captives,” “Cheer Up,” “Back Out,” and “Do It Twice”.

Excerpt from an interview of Winston Grennan by Carter Van Pelt:"...Chris Blackwell say, 'Yeah, Yeah, Yeah. I give them the money to make this record.' But at that time they was forming the band. Bob (Marley]) came to me, figure it was me, Gladdy, Winston Wright, Jackie and Hux to be the band. That was the band that Bob did really want, but those guys didn't want to get involved. You know that the situation around Bob was pretty hectic...They turned it down. So right away, I couldn't get involved, because I didn't want to leave the guys. We was doing all the sessions.Robin Kenyatta came to Jamaica, we played for him. Garland Jeffreys, Paul Simon, Peter, Paul and Mary we play for them. The Rolling Stones came down we played for them. We were the guys... we could read music. If I leave, I feel it would be a bad vibes. When Hugh Malcolm joined the group, he couldn't keep up, so they got rid of him. A little later on a drummer came along name Paul Douglas, every so often we would bring him in, because I couldn't play on a session. Paul was about the only guy, that these other guys would trust to really come and play amongst them."

“The Perfect Beat" is a song on the album Eardrum from Talib Kweli that sampled a song from Bob Marley and the Wailers called, “Do It Twice”, which is a drum beat from Paul Douglas.

Lee "Scratch" Perry and Leslie Kong 
Excerpt from the book “People Funny Boy - The Genius Of Lee "Scratch" Perry by David Katz:"On the instrumental front, Perry (Lee "Scratch" Perry) began more serious experimentation, exploring diverse influences and styles with a range of musicians. ...Perry also started working with Paul Douglas, an occasional Supersonics member and mainstay of Leslie Kong's productions."

Alton Ellis 
Douglas is credited as the drummer on Alton Ellis' "Girl I've Got A Date". "Girl I've Got A Date" is recognized as one of the first songs to define the rocksteady genre.

Tommy McCook & The Supersonics 
Douglas was a member of Tommy McCook & The Supersonics from 1968 - 1969, during which time the group released three LP's.

The Boris Gardiner Happening 
Between 1970 - 1973 Douglas was the drummer for The Boris Gardiner Happening, completing five LP's with the group. The Boris Gardiner Happening recorded a version of "Ain't No Sunshine" in 1973 with Paul Douglas singing lead, and Boris Gardiner playing bass guitar, for the album Is What's Happening.

Leroy Sibbles 
Douglas worked as a bandleader for the Leroy Sibbles band.

John Holt, The Pioneers, Eddy Grant 
Douglas toured the UK with John Holt (singer) in 1974. This was the first major reggae tour that was accompanied by a major orchestra, a 15-piece orchestra out of England. The members of this tour included six veteran session musicians: Hux Brown (Guitar), Jackie Jackson (Bass), Paul Douglas (Drums), Rad Bryan (Guitar), Winston Wright (Organ), and Gladstone Anderson (Piano). Douglas also joined and played with The Pioneers band which featured Eddy Grant from The Equals that same year in England.

Byron Lee and the Dragonaires 
In 1975 Douglas joined Byron Lee and the Dragonaires as a session musician, and later became a band member, as the group's drummer on the Sparrow Dragon Again LP.

Touring 

Douglas has toured with many artists over the course of his career, including:
 Toots and the Maytals
 Jackson Browne
 Linda Ronstadt
 Eagles
 The Who
 The Rolling Stones
 Dave Matthews Band
 The J. Geils Band
 Carlos Santana
 The Roots
 Sheryl Crow
 James Blunt

On June 24, 2017 at the Glastonbury Festival, reggae group Toots and the Maytals were slotted for 17:30 with BBC Four scheduled to show highlights from their set. When they did not show it was suspected they missed their time slot, and BBC broadcaster Mark Radcliffe apologized on their behalf stating, "If you were expecting Toots and the Maytals – and, frankly, we all were – it seems like they were on Jamaican time or something because they didn't make it to the site on time." The group credited with coining the term "reggae" in song was subsequently rescheduled by the Glastonbury Festival organizers giving them the midnight slot, with all other acts being shifted by one hour.

On July 29, 2017 Toots and The Maytals headlined the 35th anniversary of the WOMAD UK festival.

Studio work 

Douglas’ work as a session musician crosses several genres. His talent on the drums earned him recognition and respect from producers

Excerpt from an article on "Clancy Eccles":"In the U.K. Trojan Records released Clancy (Eccles)’s productions...The finest musicians available were used, with the core of his regular session crew, The Dynamites, featuring the talents of Hux Brown (guitar), Clifton "Jackie" Jackson (bass), Gladstone Anderson (piano), Winston Wright (organ) and Paul Douglas (drums)."

In addition to recordings completed as a member of affiliated acts, Douglas’ studio work includes sessions with:

 Trojan Records (Chalk Farm Studios London England)
 Beverley's All-Stars
 Federal Allstars
 Harry J Allstars
 Joe Gibbs Allstars
 The Upsetters
 Randy's
 Channel One Studios
 Derrick Harriot's Chariot
 Treasure Isle Records (Duke Reid)
 Prince Buster Allstars
 Bonnie Raitt
 The MG's
 Van McCoy
 Eddie Floyd
 Herbie Mann
 Cat Stevens (Dynamic Sounds Studio)

In an interview with Mikey Thompson on November 27, 2016 for Kool 97 FM, Jackie Jackson along with Paul Douglas and Radcliffe "Dougie" Bryan were asked about the many recordings they did together as the rhythm section for Treasure Isle Records, Beverley's Records, Channel One Studios and Federal Records.  In addition to work mentioned with Sonia Pottinger, Duke Reid, Lynn Taitt, Delroy Wilson, and Lee "Scratch" Perry, they were interviewed about working on the following songs:

 Bob Marley and the Wailers - “Nice Time”, “Hypocrites”, “Thank You Lord”, “Bus Dam Shut”, “Can’t You See” and “Small Axe”
 Phyllis Dillon - “Don’t Stay Away” and “Perfidia”
 The Melodians - “Little Nut Tree”, “Swing and Dine”, “Sweet Sensation”, and “Rivers of Babylon”
 U-Roy & The Melodians - “Version Galore”
 Bob Andy - “Fire Burning”
 Ken Boothe - “Everything I Own”, “Say You”, and “Freedom Street”
 The Gaylads - “It’s Hard To Confess” and “There’s A Fire”
 Hopeton Lewis - “Take It Easy”
 Winston Wright - “Stealing Vol. II” from “Greater Jamaica (Moon Walk-Reggay)”
 Ernie Smith - “Duppy or Gunman”
 Desmond Dekker - “Israelites”
 Desmond Dekker and the Aces - “Intensified”
 Roy Shirley - “Hold Them”
 Errol Dunkley - “You’re Gonna Need Me”
 The Congos - “Fisherman”
 John Holt & The Paragons - “Only A Smile”, “Wear You To The Ball”, “Ali Baba”, “I’ve Got To Get Away”, and “You Mean The World To Me”
 Toots and the Maytals - “Monkey Man”, “Pomps & Pride”, “Scare Him” and “Pressure Drop”

Notable televised performances 

 1990 VH1 New Visions World Beat hosted by Nile Rodgers 
 2001 Late Night with Conan O'Brien
2004 The Tonight Show with Jay Leno featuring Bonnie Raitt & Toots and the Maytals
2004 Saturday Night Live
2004 Last Call with Carson Daly
2004 Later... with Jools Holland
2010 Late Night with Jimmy Fallon
2018 The Tonight Show Starring Jimmy Fallon

Film 
In 2011, Douglas was part of the documentary released by Director George Scott and Producer Nick De Grunwald called Reggae Got Soul: The Story of Toots and the Maytals  which was featured on BBC Television. Described as “The untold story of one of the most influential artists ever to come out of Jamaica”, it features appearances by Marcia Griffiths, Jimmy Cliff, Bonnie Raitt, Eric Clapton, Keith Richards, Willie Nelson, Anthony DeCurtis, Ziggy Marley, Chris Blackwell, Paolo Nutini, Sly Dunbar, and Robbie Shakespeare.

Awards and recognition 

1981 Grammy Award Nomination for Toots Live!
1989 Grammy Award Nomination for Best Reggae Album of the Year: Toots in Memphis
1991 Grammy Award Nomination for Best Reggae Album of the Year: Toots & the Maytals – An Hour Live
1997 Canadian Reggae Music Awards
1998 Canadian Reggae Music Awards
1998 Grammy Award Nomination for Best Reggae Album of the Year: Toots & the Maytals – Ska Father
2004 Grammy Award Winner for Best Reggae Album of the Year: Toots & the Maytals - True Love
2008 Grammy Award Nomination for Best Reggae Album of the Year: Toots & the Maytals – Light Your Light
2013 Grammy Award Nomination for Best Reggae Album of the Year: Toots & The Maytals – Reggae Got Soul: Unplugged on Strawberry Hill
 2020 Grammy Award Winner for Best Reggae Album of the Year: Got To Be Tough 
 2021 Named one of Drummerworld's 'Top 500 Drummers'

Interviews 
In an interview with Batterie Magazine for their 2017 September/October edition, Douglas was asked about his work as the main drummer and musical director for Toots and the Maytals, in addition to being called upon by artists and producers such as Bob Marley, Lee Scratch Perry, Eric Gale, Ken Boothe, The Congos and Delroy Wilson. In the interview, Douglas explains one of his heroes to be Lloyd Knibb of The Skatalites, as well as being influenced my musicians such as George Benson, Carlos Santana, John Coltrane, Sam Cooke, and David Sanborn. On Sept. 10, 2021 Paul Douglas was featured on an episode of The 212 Podcast.

Museums and expositions 
From April 2017 to August 2017, Douglas is part of the Exposition Jamaica Jamaica ! at the Philharmonie de Paris in France.  Douglas is featured on the poster displayed at the exposition showing the early formation of Bob Marley & The Wailers on the Tuff Gong record label, and he is additionally part of the exposition as a member of Toots and the Maytals for their importance in the development of reggae music.

Discography 
Paul Douglas is credited on over 250 works. In 2021 he released a full-length solo album titled "Jazz Mi Reggae".

 Toots & The Maytals (1965) The Sensational Maytals
 Toots & The Maytals & Prince Buster's All Stars (1965) Dog War / Little Flea (Prince Buster)
 Toots & The Maytals (1966) Never Grow Old, (Studio One)
 Toots & The Maytals (1966) Life Could Be A Dream
 Toots & The Maytals (1968) Sweet and Dandy, (Beverley's Records)
 Tommy McCook & The Supersonics (1968) Mary Poppins
 King Stitt (1969) Herdsman Shuffle
 King Stitt (1969) Lee Van Cleef
 The Maytals (1969) Sweet And Dandy / Oh - Yea (7”) (Beverley's Records)
 Toots & The Maytals (1969) Monkey Man
 Tommy McCook & The Supersonics (1969) Red Ash
 Tommy McCook & The Supersonics (1969) Tribute to Rameses
 King Stitt & The Dynamites (1969) Vigorton 2
 The Melodians (1970) Everybody Bawling
 Ken Boothe (1970) Freedom Street
 Clancy Eccles And The Dynamites (1970) Herbsman Reggae
 Boris Gardiner (1970) Reggae Happening
 Delano Stewart (1970) Stay A Little Bit Longer
 The Melodians (1970) Sweet Sensation
 Delano Stewart (1970) That's Life
 The Gaylads (1970) There's A Fire
 Bob and Marcia (1970) Young Gifted and Black
 Toots & The Maytals (1970) Feel Alright (7") (Beverley's Records)
 Bob Marley & The Wailers (1970) Baby Baby Come Home
 Bob Marley & The Wailers (1970) Sophisticated Psychedelication
 Bob Marley & The Wailers (1971) Soul Shakedown Party
 Bob Marley & The Wailers (1971) The Best of the Wailers
 Toots & The Maytals (1971) Bam-Bam / Pomps And Pride (7") (Dynamic Sounds)
 Boris Gardiner (1971) Soulful Experience
 Toots & The Maytals (1971) Greatest Hits (Beverley Records)
 Toots & The Maytals (1972) The Harder They Come, (Island)
 Toots & The Maytals (1972) Slatyam Stoot
 Toots & The Maytals (1972) Daddy / It Was Written Down (Jaguar)
 Toots & The Maytals (1972) Pomps And Pride (Jaguar)
 Toots & The Maytals (1972) Country Road / Louie Louie (Jaguar)
 Toots & The Maytals (1972) Louie Louie / Pressure Drop '72 (Trojan Records)
 Boris Gardiner (1972) For All We Know
 The Boris Gardiner Happening (1973) Is What's Happening
 Toots & The Maytals (1973) Sit Right Down (Dragon)
 Toots & The Maytals (1973) Country Road / Funky Kingston (Dragon)
 Toots & The Maytals (1973) In The Dark / Sailing On (Jaguar)
 Jimmy Cliff / Toots & The Maytals (1973) You Can Get It If You Really Want / Sweet & Dandy (Mango)
 Toots & The Maytals (1973) Screwface Underground (Jaguar)
 Toots & The Maytals (1973) Daddy (7”, Single) (Blue Mountain)
 Toots & The Maytals (1973) Country Road (Island Records)
 Toots & The Maytals (1973) From the Roots, (Trojan)
 Toots & The Maytals (1973) Funky Kingston, (Trojan)
 Toots & The Maytals (1973) The Original Golden Oldies Vol.3
 Vic Taylor (1973) Reflections
 Ernie Smith (1974) Duppy Gunman
 Ken Boothe (1974) Everything I Own
 Toots & The Maytals (1974) In the Dark, (Dragon Records)
 Toots & The Maytals (1974) Who Knows Better (Hot Shot!)
 Toots & The Maytals (1974) Time Tough (Jaguar)
 Toots & The Maytals (1974) I Can't Believe / 5446 Instrumental (Starapple)
 Toots & The Maytals (1974) Sailing On / If You Act This Way (7") (Dragon)
 Toots & The Maytals (1974) You Don't Love Me (So Bad) (7", Single) (Jaguar)
 Bob Andy (1974) Fire Burning
 Fr. Richard HoLung, Harrison & Friends (1974) Letters Job To John
 Toots & The Maytals (1975) Reggae's Got Soul (Jaguar)
 Susan Cadogan (1975) Hurts So Good
 Horace Forbes (1975) Impossible<
 Faith D'Aguilar (1975) Jamaica
 Eric Gale (1975) Negril
 Pluto Shervington (1975) Pluto
 Byron Lee And The Dragonaires & Mighty Sparrow (1975) Sparrow Dragon Again
 Johnny Nash (1975) Tears On My Pillow
 Ken Boothe (1976) Blood Brothers
 Pluto Shervington (1976) Dat
 R.D. Livingstone (1976) Home From Home
 Errol Brown (1976) Pleasure Dub
 Pluto Shervington (1976) Ram Goat Liver
 Toots & The Maytals (1976) Reggae Got Soul (Island)
 King Tubby & Clancy Eccles All Stars (1976) Sound System International Dub LP
 Funky Brown (1976) These Songs Will Last Forever
 Bob Marley & The Wailers / Toots & The Maytals (1976) Trenchtown Rock / Reggae Got Soul (7”) (Island Records)
 Toots & The Maytals (1976) Image Get A Lick (7") (Warika)
 The Congos & Friends (1977) Fisherman
 The Congos (1977) Heart Of The Congos
 The Mexicano (1977) Move Up Starsky
 Musicism (1977) Swing Me Gentle
 Musicism (1977) Riding In Rhythm
 The Maytals (1977) Toots Presents The Maytals
 Toots & The Maytals (1978) Famine / Pass The Pipe (Island Records)
 Toots & The Maytals (1978) Take It From Me (7") (Island Records)
 Harold Butler (1978) Gold Connection
 Ernie Smith (1978) I'll Sing For Jesus
 Derrick Morgan (1978) Love City
 Lovindeer (1978) Sexy Reggae
 The Mexicano (1978) Goddess Of Love
 Jackie Edwards (1978) Starlight
 Dandy Livingstone (1978) The South African Experience
 Toots & The Maytals (1979) Israel Children / Turn It Up (7") (Louv)
 Multiple Artists (1979) Children Of Babylon (Original Motion Picture Soundtrack)<
 Nana McLean (1979) Dream Of Life
 Danny Adams (1979) Summer In Montego Bay
 Ojiji (1979) The Shadow
 Toots & The Maytals (1979) Pressure Drop: Best of Toots & The Maytals (Trojan)
 Toots & The Maytals (1979) Pass the Pipe, (Island)
 Toots & The Maytals (1979) Just Like That, (Island)
 Toots & The Maytals (1979) The Best Of Toots And The Maytals (Trojan Records)
 Toots & The Maytals (1980) Just Like That / Gone With The Wind (Island Records)
 Toots & The Maytals (1980) Toots & The Maytals E.P. (Island Records)
 Toots & The Maytals (1980) Chatty, Chatty (Island Records)
 Toots & The Maytals (1980) Live: Monkey Man / Hallelujah (7") (Island Records)
 Toots & The Maytals (1980) Chatty, Chatty (7", Single) (Island Records)
 Toots & The Maytals (1980) Toots “Live,” (Island)
 Hearbert Lee (1980) Love Songs Vol. 1
 Bobby Stringer (1980) Reggae Love Songs
 Ossie Scott (1980) Many Moods Of Ossie Scott
 Toots & The Maytals (1981) I Can See Clearly Now (Island Records)
 Toots & The Maytals (1981) Beautiful Woman (Island Records)
 Toots & The Maytals (1981) Papa D / You Never Know (Louv)
 Toots & The Maytals (1981) Beautiful Woman / Show Me The Way (12") (Island Records)
 Toots & The Maytals (1981) Papa Dee Mama Dear / Dilly Dally (7", Single) (Island Records)
 Toots & The Maytals (1981) His Songs Live On (7") (Louv)
 Toots & the Maytals (1981) Knock Out!
 Beres Hammond (1981) Let's Make A Song
 Multiple Artists (1981) The King Kong Compilation: The Historic Reggae Recordings
 Toots & The Maytals (1982) I Know We Can Make It / Spend A Weekend (7", Single) (Island Records)
 Dennis Brown / Toots & The Maytals (1982) Sitting & Watching / Bam Bam (7", Single) (Island Records)
 Toots & The Maytals (1982) Knockout, (Island)
 Live at Reggae Sunsplash: Best of the Festival r(1982) Day One<
 Toots & the Maytals (1982) Hour Live
 Pluto Shervington (1982) I Man Born Ya
 Pioneers (1982) Reggae For Lovers
 Pluto Shervington (1982) Your Honour
 Lovindeer (1983) Man Shortage
 Ochi Brown (1983) Danger Date
 Boyo (1983) You're My World
 George Pioneer & Jackie Pioneer (1983) Reggae For Lovers Volume 2
 Toots & The Maytals (1984) Live At Reggae Sunsplash
 Toots & The Maytals (1984) Reggae Greats (Island)
 Owen Gray (1985) Watch This Sound
 Lovindeer (1987) Caribbean Christmas Cheer
 Lovindeer (1988) Octapussy
 Toots & The Maytals (1988) Toots in Memphis, (Island)
 Toots & The Maytals (1988) Do The Reggae 1966-1970 (Attack Records)
 (1990) Clancy Eccles Presents His Reggae Revue>
 Toots & The Maytals (1990) An Hour Live
 Bob Marley & The Wailers (1992) Songs Of Freedom  CD-01
 Toots & The Maytals (1992) Knock Out!
 The Maytals (1993) Bla. Bla. Bla.
 Multiple Artists (1993) Kingston Town: 18 Reggae Hits
 Multiple Artists (1993) The Story of Jamaican Music: Tougher Than Tough
 Toots & The Maytals (1995) The Collection (Spectrum)
 Clancy Eccles (1996) Joshua's Rod of Correction
 King Stitt (1996) Reggae Fire Beat
 The Dynamites (1996) The Wild Reggae Bunch
 Toots & The Maytals (1996) Time Tough: The Anthology (Island)
 Toots & The Maytals (1996) Monkey Man ((Compilation) (House Of Reggae)
 Toots & The Maytals (1997) Recoup, (Alia Son)
 Multiple Artists (1997) Fire On The Mountain: Reggae Celebrates The Grateful Dead Vol. 1 & 2
 Clancy Eccles & The Dynamites (1997) Nyah Reggae Rock
 Bob Marley & The Wailers (1998) The Complete Wailers CD-03
 From Chapter To Version (1998) 20 Reggae DJ Classics
 Multiple Artists (1998) From GG's Reggae Hit Stable Volume 1 & 2
 Derrick Harriott (1998) Riding The Roots Chariot
 Toots & The Maytals (1998) Live in London, (Trojan)
 Toots & The Maytals (1998) The Very Best of Toots & The Maytals, (Music Club)
 Toots & The Maytals (1998) Ska Father, (Artists Only)
 Toots & The Maytals (1998) Jamaican Monkey Man (Recall 2 cd)
 The Maytals / Toots & the Maytals (1999) Monkey Man & From The Roots
 Toots & the Maytals (1999) That's My Number
 The Maytals (1999) The Originals (Charly)
 Morgan Heritage & Denroy Morgan / Toots & The Maytals (1999) Harvest Is Plenty / Lost Your Character (7") (HMG Records)
 Toots & The Maytals (1999) Bam Bam / 54 - 46 (7") (Marvellous Records)
 Toots & The Maytals (1999) Prayer of David (7", Single) (Treasure Chest)
 Toots & The Maytals (2000) Live At Red Rocks (PRG Records, Allah Son Records)
 Toots & The Maytals (2000) The Very Best Of Toots & The Maytals (Island Records)
 Toots & The Maytals (2000) 20 Massive Hits (Compilation) (Metro)
 The Maytals (2001) Fever
 The Maytals (2001) Dressed to Kill
 Toots & The Maytals (2001) 54-46 Was My Number - Anthology 1964 To 2000 (Trojan Records)
 Toots & The Maytals (2001) Best Of Toots & The Maytals / Broadway Jungle (Trojan Records)
 Toots & The Maytals (2001) The Best Of Toots & The Maytals (Island Records)
 Clancy Eccles (2001) Reggae Revue at the VIP Club, Vol. 3
 Clancy Eccles (2001) Reggae Revue at the Ward Theatre 1969-1970
 (2001) The Reggae Box
 Toots & The Maytals / L.M.S.* (2002) Humble / Respect All Woman (7") (71 Records)
 Toots & The Maytals (2002) Sweet And Dandy: The Best of Toots and the Maytals (Trojan Records)
 Toots & the Maytals (2003) World Is Turning
 Toots & The Maytals (2003) 54 - 46 / Pressure Drop (7”) (Beverley's Records)
 Toots & The Maytals (2003) Funky Kingston / In The Dark (Compilation) (Island Records)
 Toots & The Maytals (2003) Jungle (Single) (XIII BIS Records)
 Paul Douglas (2004) Eyes Down
 Toots & the Maytals (2004) True Love
 Toots & The Maytals (2004) This Is Crucial Reggae (Compilation) (Sanctuary Records)
 Toots & The Maytals Featuring Shaggy And Rahzel (2004) Bam Bam (V2)
 Toots & The Maytals (2005) Pressure Drop: The Definitive Collection (Trojan Records)
 Toots & The Maytals (2005) Roots Reggae - The Classic Jamaican Albums (Trojan Records)
 Toots & The Maytals (2005) Rhythm Kings (Compilation) (Xtra)
 Toots & The Maytals (2005) Deep In My Soul / Daddy (Beverley's Records)
 Toots & The Maytals (2005) Border Line (Single) (XIII Bis Records)
 Toots & The Maytals (2006) The Essential Collection (Compilation) (Sanctuary Records)
 The Congos & Friends (2006) Fisherman Style
 Toots & The Maytals (2006) I’ve Got A Woman (A Tribute To Ray Charles) (7") (D&F Productions)
 Toots & The Maytals (2006) Acoustically Live at Music Millennium (CD, EP) (Junketboy)
 Toots & the Maytals (2007) Light Your Light
 Ben Harper & The Skatalites / Toots & The Maytals (2007) Be My Guest / I Want You To Know (Imperial)
 Toots & The Maytals (2008) Sweet And Dandy: The Best of Toots & The Maytals (Compilation) (Trojan Records)
 Glen Ricketts (2008) Rise Up
 Tommy McCook & The Supersonics (2009) Pleasure Dub
 The Dynamites / King Tubby (2009) Sound System International
 Eugene Grey (2010) Diversity
 Toots & the Maytals (2010) Flip and Twist
 Toots And The Maytals / Roland Alphonso (2010) Hold On / On The Move (7") (Pyramid)
 Toots & The Maytals (2010) Pee Pee Cluck Cluck (7”) (Pyramid)
 Toots & The Maytals / Don Drummond (2010) Alidina / Dragon Weapon (7") (Pyramid)
 Toots & The Maytals (2011) Pressure Drop: The Golden Tracks (Cleopatra)
 Toots & The Maytals (2012) Pressure Drop: The Best of Toots and The Maytals (Compilation) (Universal UMC, Island Records)
 Toots & The Maytals (2012) Live! (Island Records)
 Toots & The Maytals (2012) 54 - 46 (Beverley's Records)
 Delroy Wilson / Toots & The Maytals (2012) Gave You My Love / One Eye Enos (7”) (Beverley's Records)
 Toots & The Maytals (2012) Unplugged On Strawberry Hill
 Toots & The Maytals (2014) Sunny (7", Single) (Notable Records, Measurable Music)
 Toots & The Maytals (2020) Got to Be Tough (Trojan Jamaica/BMG)
 Paul Douglas (2021) Jazz Mi Reggae
 Priscilla Rollins (197X) I Love You
 Tito Simon (197X) The Heat Is On
 Demo Cates (197X) Precious Love
 Milton Douglas (198X) Can't Trust No One
 George Allison (198X) Exclusive
 Marie Bowie & K.C. White & Hortense Ellis (198X) More Reggae Love Songs
 Bobby Davis (198X) Satisfaction
 Toots & The Maytals - Reggae Live Sessions Volume 2 (Jahmin' Records)
 Danny Ray - All The Best
 Ossie Scott - The Great Pretender
 Toots & The Maytals - Peeping Tom (7", Single) (Beverley's Records)
 Toots & The Maytals - Sweet & Dandy (Single) (Beverley's Records)
 Toots & The Maytals - Pain In My Belly / Treating Me Bad (7”) (Prince Buster)
 Toots & The Maytals / Byron Lee - She Never Let Me Down / River To The Bank (Federal)
 Toots & The Maytals / Desmond Dekker - Pressure Drop / Mother's Young Gal (7", Single) (Beverley's Records)
 Toots & The Maytals - Never Go Down (7") (Warika)
 Toots & The Maytals - Israel Children (7", Single) (Righteous)
 Toots & The Maytals / Ansel Collins - Monkey Man / High Voltage (7") (Beverley's Records)
 Tony Tribe / Eric Donaldson / The Upsetters / Toots & The Maytals - Classic Tracks (CD, EP) (Classic Tracks - CDEP4)
 Toots & The Maytals - Scare Him (7") (Gorgon Records)
 Toots & The Maytals - Careless Ethiopians (7") (Nyahman)
 Toots & The Maytals - Do Good All The Time (7") (Nyahman)
 Toots & The Maytals - Daddy (7") (Jaguar)
 Desmond Dekker And The Aces, Toots And The Maytals - You Can Get It If You Really Want / Pressure Drop (7") (Beverley's Records)
 Toots & The Maytals - Monkey Man / It Was Written (7") (D&F Records)
 Toots & The Maytals - Prayer of David (7", Single) (Charm)
 Toots & The Maytals - Happy Days (7", Single) (Righteous)
 Toots & The Maytals - Happy Christmas / If You Act This Way (7", Single) (Jaguar)
 Toots & The Maytals - One Family (7", Single) (Righteous)
 Toots & The Maytals - Pressure Drop (7”) (Island Records)
 Toots & The Maytals - Have A Talk (7") (Black Noiz Music)
 Toots & The Maytals / The Dynamic Sisters - We Are No Strangers (7") (Thunder Bolt)
 Toots & The Maytals - Fool For You / Version (7", Single) (Allah Son Records)
 Toots & The Maytals - More And More / Version (7", Single) (Allah Son Records)
 Toots & The Maytals - Hard Road / Version (7", Single) (Allah Son Records)
 Bob Marley / Toots & The Maytals - Classic Tracks (CD, EP) (Classic Tracks - CDEP 3C)
 Toots & The Maytals - 54-46 Was My Number (Slow Cut) (7") (Beverley's Records)
 Desmond Dekker & The Aces / Toots & The Maytals - You Can Get It If You Really Want / Sweet & Dandy (7") (Beverley's Records)

Instruments and sponsorships 
 Paul Douglas is an official artist of Sabian, one of the "big four" manufacturers of cymbals.
 Favourite Sabian Cymbal: 16'' O Zone Evolution Crash, AAH 14'' Stage Hi Hats, HHX, 18'' HHX China

References 

Jamaican drummers
1950 births
Living people
People from Saint Ann Parish
Toots and the Maytals members